A boilermaker is either of two types of beer cocktail. In American terminology, the drink consists of a glass of beer mixed with a shot of whiskey.

Name
The drink originated in Butte, Montana, in the 1890s, and was originally called a Sean O'Farrell and was served only when miners ended their shifts. When the beer is served as a chaser, the drink is often called simply a shot and a beer.

In Britain, the term boilermaker traditionally refers to a half pint of draught mild mixed with a half pint of bottled brown ale, although it also refers to the American shot and pint. In Scotland, a half and a half is a half pint of beer with a whisky ("a wee hawf"). The use of these terms in Scottish and English pubs can be traced back to about 1920.

Drinking
There are a number of ways to drink an American beer chaser:

 Traditionally, the liquor is consumed in a single gulp and is then "chased" by the beer, which is sipped.
 The liquor and beer may be mixed by pouring or dropping the shot into the beer. The mixture may be stirred. If the shot glass is dropped into the beer glass, the drink can also be known as a depth charge.

Similar drinks
Other pairings of a shot and a beer are possible; traditional pairings include:
 Herrengedeck ("gentlemen's menu"), a German pairing of Korn (grain brandy) and beer
 Irish car bomb (cocktail), a pairing of a shot of Irish cream and whiskey into a glass of stout
  ("little headbutt"), a Dutch pairing of Jenever (Dutch gin) and beer, term attested 1943
 Somaek or Poktan-ju, a Korean pairing of soju and beer
 U-boot, a pairing of vodka and beer
 The Chicago Handshake or Chicago Drive-by, a shot of Jeppson's Malört alongside Old Style beer
 The Citywide, sometimes called the Citywide Special, a Philadelphia pairing of a shot of Jim Beam and a Pabst Blue Ribbon
The Sake Bomb or A-Bomb or Fat Man or Nagasaki or Hiroshima is the pairing of or depth charge of a pint of Japanese label beer and sake. Typically drunk in a single motion like a depth charge but it can be mixed, and swallowed in a go.

See also
 Black and tan
 Queen Mary (beer cocktail)
 Shandy
 Yorsh

References

Shooters (drinks)
Cocktails with beer
Cocktails
Two-ingredient cocktails
Cocktails with whisky
Butte, Montana